Graves into Gardens is the eighth live album (twelfth album overall) by American contemporary worship band Elevation Worship. It was released on May 1, 2020, via Elevation Worship Records alongside Provident Label Group. The album contains guest appearances by Brandon Lake of Bethel Music, Cody Carnes, Kari Jobe, Tauren Wells and Isaiah Templeton. Steven Furtick, Aaron Robertson, Chris Brown, and Jonathan Mix collaborated on the production of the album.

The album was supported by the release of "The Blessing", "Graves into Gardens" and "Rattle!" as singles. "The Blessing" peaked at No. 15 on the Bubbling Under Hot 100 chart, and No. 2 on the Hot Christian Songs chart in the United States, and has been certified gold by Recording Industry Association of America (RIAA). "Graves into Gardens" became Elevation Worship's highest charting single, registering their first No. 1 single on the Hot Christian Songs chart, and peaking at No. 2 on the Bubbling Under Hot 100 chart. "Rattle!" peaked at No. 4 on the Hot Christian Songs chart, and at No. 25 on the Bubbling Under Hot 100 chart. Elevation Worship had initially intended to further promote the album by embarking on the Elevation Nights 2020 tour with pastor Steven Furtick, but the tour was cancelled due to COVID-19 pandemic.

Graves into Gardens was released to critical acclaim, while achieving commercial success with debuting at No. 1 on Billboard's Top Christian Albums Chart in the United States, and No. 2 on the OCC's Official Christian & Gospel Albums Chart in the United Kingdom, concurrently attaining top 100 mainstream chart entries in the United States, Australia, Canada, Scotland and Switzerland. The album was nominated for Billboard Music Award for Top Christian Album at the 2021 Billboard Music Awards. Graves into Gardens received nominations for the GMA Dove Award Worship Album of the Year and Recorded Music Packaging of the Year at the 2021 GMA Dove Awards, ultimately winning the Recorded Music Packaging of the Year award.

Background
Elevation Worship's Chris Brown shared the meaning behind the album title and its theme, saying:

Recording and production

The album's nine original tracks were recorded over a night on January 15, 2020, at Elevation Church's Ballantyne campus in Charlotte, North Carolina, where previous Elevation Worship projects have been recorded. Elevation Worship's Chris Brown noted that while most of the songs were written in 2019, "Rattle" and "The Blessing" were written and recorded in early 2020. The band collaborated with Bethel Music's Brandon Lake in writing a number of songs on the album and featured on the album's title track, other collaborators also included Kari Jobe and Cody Carnes on co-writing and leading "The Blessing" as well as Tauren Wells lending his vocals on "Never Lost".

"The Blessing" was written by Jobe, Carnes, together with Steven Furtick and Brown in a writing session on Thursday, February 27, 2020, at Elevation prior to leading it at Elevation's Sunday service on March 1, 2020.
"Rattle" was written during quarantine with voice memos and over Zoom calls, and the track was recorded without a live audience, with the band practicing social distancing due to the COVID-19 pandemic.

Release and promotion

Singles
"The Blessing" was officially released as the lead single of the album on March 20, 2020. The song debuted at No. 3 and No. 4 on the Hot Christian Songs and the Digital Song Sales charts dated April 24, 2020, respectively. The song peaked at No. 2 on the Hot Christian Songs chart, and No. 15 on the Bubbling Under Hot 100 chart.

"Graves into Gardens" was sent to Christian radio stations on August 21, 2020, as the second official single from the album. The song went on to become Elevation Worship's first No. 1 single on the Hot Christian Songs and Christian Airplay charts. The song also peaked at No. 2 on the Bubbling Under Hot 100 chart.

"Rattle!" was released to Christian radio stations in the United States on April 23, 2021, as the third official single from the album and peaked at No. 6 on the Hot Christian Songs chart.

Promotional singles
On March 14, 2020, the album was availed for pre-order, with "Graves into Gardens" released as the first promotional single from the album. On April 3, 2020, "My Testimony" was released as the second promotional single from the album. "Rattle!" was availed on April 24, 2020, as the album's third promotional single.

On the day of its release, Elevation Worship announced that the project became the highest pre-added worship album to date on Apple Music.

Touring
In October 2019, Premier Productions announced that Elevation Worship alongside Pastor Steven Furtick would be going on their first arena tour, dubbed Elevation Nights 2020. The tour was slated to commence at the H-E-B Center at Cedar Park in Austin, Texas, on May 26, 2020, and set to conclude at Barclays Center in New York City. The band revealed in March 2020 that the tour will be in support of the then upcoming album.

In April 2020, Elevation Worship announced that the Elevation Nights 2020 tour was cancelled in response to combating the COVID-19 pandemic.

Reception

Critical response

Graves into Gardens was met with generally positive reviews. Joshua Andre in his 365 Days of Inspiring Media review praised the album in his review, saying, "I reckon their latest offering is one of the most cohesive ever- yep even more so than Hallelujah Here Below." At CCM Magazine, Dan McIntosh rated the album three-point-five stars out of five, he acknowledged that the collection has "some truly standout tracks," but bemoaned the overall length saying, "this album could have used a little editing." Herb Longs of The Christian Beat gave the album five out of five stars and said that it "dynamically showcases the collective talents of the group while spotlighting a number of special guests". Timothy Yap, in his review for Hallels, felt that the album was underwhelming as it did not match the poetic and artful depiction of the album artwork, saying "Though there are still moments of sublimity, they are all mixed together in what feels like an extremely long album, with one of the songs marathoning close to the 10-minute mark." Michael Weaver of Jesus Freak Hideout complimented the range of the tracks, saying "Elevation manages to break things up just by changing vocalists, but also by completely changing styles. The album features rock, contemporary worship, pop, and gospel music. Not many of the major worship groups are swinging for the fences in this way." Rob Allwright, reviewing for One Man In The Middle, opined "A lot of these songs are faithbuilding and uplifting which is something that is so desperately needed at the moment. Maybe at another time they wouldn’t have hit home quite so strongly, but in the middle of a global pandemic then we need that God is still in control and a reminder of what happens when God says live, even the dead dry bones MUST come to life."

Accolades

Commercial performance
In the United States, Graves into Gardens earned 16,000 equivalent album units in its first week of sales, and as a result debuted at No. 1 on the Top Christian Albums Chart dated May 16, 2020, the band's fifth chart-topping release on the tally. The album concurrently registered on the mainstream Billboard 200 chart at No. 34. Graves into Gardens debuted on the OCC's Official Christian & Gospel Albums Chart at No. 2.

Graves into Gardens also appeared at No. 38 on the Australian ARIA Albums Chart, No 66 on the Canadian Albums Chart, No. 39 on Scottish Albums, and No 47 on the Swiss Hitparade.

Track listing

Personnel
Adapted from AllMusic.

 Lizzy Abernethy — background vocals
 Jenna Barrientes — background vocals
 Jonsal Barrientes — vocals
 Vincent Baynard — drums
 Joe Booth — saxophone
 Jacob Boyles — art direction, design, photography
 Chris Brown — acoustic guitar, producer, vocals
 Shantay Brown — background vocals
 Jonathan Buffum — engineer
 Cody Carnes — primary artist, vocals
 David Cook — engineer
 Chunks Corbett — music business affairs
 Elevation Worship — primary artist
 Steven Furtick — executive producer, producer
 Dominic Geralds — drums
 Sam Gibson — mixing
 Tiffany Hammer — vocals
 Ryan Hollingsworth — art direction
 Phillip Howe — trumpet
 Brad Hudson — background vocals, vocal producer
 Kari Jobe — primary artist, vocals
 Andrew Joseph — background vocals
 Brandon Lake — featured artist, acoustic guitar, vocals
 Drew Lavyne — mastering
 Josh Linker — engineer
 David Liotta — acoustic guitar, guitar
 Jonathan Mix — additional production, editing, engineer, Flugelhorn, trumpet
 Davide Mutendji — background vocals
 Jack Nellis — editing, engineer, percussion
 Taylor Noel — background vocals
 Roseanne Parker — background vocals
 Michael Pettus — background vocals
 Paul Rivera — photography
 Aaron Robertson — keyboards, producer, programming
 Anna Sailors — vocals
 Joey Signa — guitar
 Kevin Smith — guitar
 Isaiah Templeton — featured artist, vocals
 Tauren Wells — featured artist, vocals
 Jane Williams — background vocals
 Caleb Wood — background vocals
 Shae Wooten — bass

Charts

Weekly charts

Year-end charts

Release history

References

External links
 

2020 live albums
Elevation Worship albums